The Hezbollah Movement in Iraq, also known as Jihad and Construction movement(حركة الجهاد والبناء), is a Shi'a Islamist, Iraqi political party that is part of the United Iraqi Alliance coalition.  It is not affiliated with the Lebanese group Hezbollah or other groups using the name. Hezbollah, or more literally Hizb Allah (حزب الله), meaning "Party of God" in Arabic.

The party publishes the Al-Bayyna newspaper and is led by Hassan Al-Sari. Hezbollah originated as an underground anti-Saddam network. Unlike other anti-Saddam groups it remained based in Iraq, not setting up shop in Iran or the West. The party is closely aligned to the Islamic Supreme Council of Iraq, previously known as the Supreme Council for Islamic Revolution in Iraq.

History

Post-Invasion
Following the 2003 invasion of Iraq, the Hezbollah Movement seized buildings formerly used by the Iraqi General Intelligence Service in the al-Alwiya neighborhood of Baghdad. On 16 August 2004, INIS & Major Crimes Directorate personnel raided the building with support from forces wearing US clothing, conflicting reports identified the forces as either the Iraqi National Guard  or US Forces. Present Hezbollah staff and officials, including Secretary-General Hassan Al-Sari, were arrested and detained for periods ranging from 10 days to 2 months. During this time they were interrogated over the group's links to Iran.

References

https://www.alsumaria.tv/news/216789/حركة-الجهاد-والبناء-تعلن-انفصالها-عن-تيار-الحكمة-و/ar
http://www.wataniq.com/news?ID=19801
https://www.knoozmedia.com/261336/http://قيادات-في-حركة-الجهاد-والبناء-تعلن-تمس/
http://www.alliraqnews.com/modules/news/article.php?storyid=66426
http://www.irna.ir/ar/News/82947973
https://www.iraqakhbar.com/639652
http://afaq.tv/contents/view/details?id=8373
http://www.irna.ir/ar/News/82934119
https://web.archive.org/web/20131204130346/http://almadapress.com/ar/news/22071/%D8%AD%D8%B1%D9%83%D8%A9-%D8%A7%D9%84%D8%AC%D9%87%D8%A7%D8%AF-%D9%88%D8%A7%D9%84%D8%A8%D9%86%D8%A7%D8%A1-%D8%AD%D8%B1%D8%B1%D9%86%D8%A7-%D8%A7%D9%84%D8%A8%D9%84%D8%A7%D8%AF-%D9%85%D9%86

Factions in the Iraq War
Islamic political parties in Iraq
Shia Islamic political parties
Rebel groups in Iraq
Political parties established in 2008
2008 establishments in Iraq
Axis of Resistance